Karabanikha is a rural locality (a village) in Krasnoselskoye Rural Settlement, Yuryev-Polsky District, Vladimir Oblast, Russia. The population was 3 as of 2010.

Geography 
Karabanikha is located 19 km northwest of Yuryev-Polsky (the district's administrative centre) by road. Makhlino is the nearest rural locality.

References 

Rural localities in Yuryev-Polsky District